The Impossible Bird is an album by British singer-songwriter Nick Lowe. Produced by Lowe and Neil Brockbank, it was released in the United Kingdom in 1994 on Demon Records and elsewhere by Upstart Records.

Reception

In a contemporary review of The Impossible Bird, Rolling Stone critic Paul Evans said that the album showed Lowe "in excellent form" with songs that "demonstrate a prodigious productivity and an emotional realism that ranges from heartbreak... to a well-earned bittersweet humor". People called it a "high point" for Lowe, while Los Angeles Times critic Mike Boehm wrote: "The only real impossibility on this album lies in trying to resist the gently seductive pop charms of the crafty old bird who made it." Less receptive was Robert Christgau of The Village Voice, who merely gave the album a "neither" rating.

Track listing

Personnel
Nick Lowe – bass guitar, rhythm guitar, acoustic guitar
Gary Grainger – guitar 
Bill Kirchen – trombone, electric guitar
Paul Riley – bass guitar
Bobby Irwin – drums 
Geraint Watkins – organ, electric guitar

Notes

External links
 

1994 albums
Nick Lowe albums